Rosemary Márquez (born February 28, 1968) is a United States district judge of the United States District Court for the District of Arizona.

Early life and education 

Márquez's parents, Miguel and Catalina Márquez, emigrated from Sonora, Mexico. Márquez was born in Los Angeles, California in 1968, but her family later moved to Bisbee, Arizona in order to be closer to Sonora. She earned a Bachelor of Arts degree in 1990 from the University of Arizona and a Juris Doctor from the University of Arizona College of Law in 1993.

Professional career 

From 1994 until 1996, Márquez served as a public defender in Pima County, Arizona.  From 1996 until 2000, she served as an assistant federal public defender. From 2000 to 2014, Márquez worked in private law practice in Tucson, Arizona, focusing her efforts on federal criminal defense.

Federal judicial service

During the 111th United States Congress, Democrats from the Arizona House delegation recommended Márquez to fill the vacancy on the United States District Court for the District of Arizona created by Judge Frank R. Zapata's decision to take senior status. On June 23, 2011, during the 112th Congress, President Obama formally nominated Márquez to serve as a judge for the District of Arizona. Due to opposition by Arizona Senators John McCain and Jon Kyl, both Republicans, her nomination did not receive a hearing in the 112th Congress. On January 2, 2013, her nomination was returned to the President, due to the sine die adjournment of the Senate. On January 3, 2013, she was renominated to the same office. On September 19, 2013, Senator McCain indicated that he would support the nomination of Márquez, as well as four other nominees made to the United States District Court for the District of Arizona on that day.  Her hearing was before the Senate Judiciary Committee on January 28, 2014, and her nomination was reported to the United States Senate by a 15–2 vote on February 27, 2014. On May 13, 2014, Senate Majority Leader Harry Reid filed for cloture on her nomination. On May 15, 2014, the Senate voted 58–35 on the motion to invoke cloture on her nomination. Later that same day, The Senate voted 81–15 in favor of final confirmation. She received her judicial commission on May 19, 2014.

Notable cases

In a August 30, 2021 ruling, Marquez threw out a Trump-era rule that permitted the draining and filling of streams, marshes, and wetlands, finding that leaving it in place would lead to "serious environmental harm".

See also
 Barack Obama judicial appointment controversies
 List of Hispanic/Latino American jurists

References

External links
 
 

1968 births
Living people
American women lawyers
Hispanic and Latino American judges
James E. Rogers College of Law alumni
Judges of the United States District Court for the District of Arizona
People from Bisbee, Arizona
People from Pima County, Arizona
Public defenders
United States district court judges appointed by Barack Obama
University of Arizona alumni
21st-century American judges
21st-century American women judges